The 1963–64 Liga Gimel season saw 155 clubs competing in 16 regional divisions for promotion to Liga Bet.

Hapoel Hulata, Hapoel Beit Eliezer, Beitar Beit Lid, Hapoel Shefayim, Beitar Petah Tikva, Beitar Ramat Gan, Beitar Rehovot, ASA Jerusalem, Hapoel Kiryat Malakhi and Hapoel Be'eri won their regional divisions and promoted to Liga Bet.

Promotion play-offs, held in neutral venues, were contested between six other regional division winners and saw Beitar Kiryat Tiv'on, Hapoel Yagur and Hapoel Ashdod win over Hapoel Beit She'an, Al-Amal Acre and Hapoel Dimona

15 clubs did not finish the season due to suspensions and withdrawals, which were: Hapoel Kfar Baruch, Hapoel Neve Eitan, Hapoel Givat Oz, Hapoel Ma'alot, Hapoel Shlomi, Hapoel Matzuva, Hapoel Kadima, Hapoel HaKochav Or Yehuda, Hapoel Zarnuga, Hapoel Mishmar HaSharon, Hapoel Nir Yitzhak, Maccabi Jerusalem, Maccabi Kfar Ata, Beitar Mahane Israel and Beitar Ramat HaSharon.

Upper Galilee Division

North Division

Valleys A Division

Valleys B Division

Haifa Division

Carmel Division

Samaria Division

Sharon Division

Petah Tikva Division

Tel Aviv Division

Central Division

Jerusalem Division

South A Division

South B Division

Negev A Division

Negev B Division

Promotion play-offs

Beitar Kiryat Tiv'on, Hapoel Yagur and Hapoel Ashdod promoted to Liga Bet. Hapoel Ashdod promoted after their opponents, Hapoel Dimona, did not show up for the match.

See also
1963–64 Liga Leumit
1963–64 Liga Alef
1963–64 Liga Bet

References
Liga Gimel requests: "Don't want Play-offs!" (Page 3) Moshe Kashtan, Hadshot HaSport, 6 July 1964, archive.football.co.il 

Liga Gimel seasons
4